Ratnagiri (IAST:Ratnāgirī ; [ɾət̪n̪aːɡiɾiː]) is a port city on the Arabian Sea coast in Ratnagiri District in the southwestern part of Maharashtra, India. The district is a part of Konkan division of Maharashtra. The city is known for the Hapus or Alphonso mangoes. Ratnagiri is the birthplace of Indian independence activist Lokmanya Tilak. Thibaw, the last king of Burma, alongside his consort Supayalat and two infant daughters were exiled to a two-storied brick mansion in Ratnagiri. The building is now known as Thibaw Palace.

Geography
It has an average elevation of 11 meters (36 feet). The Sahyadri mountains border Ratnagiri to the east

Climate

Transport
Road

Ratnagiri is well connected to the other parts of the state and country by National Highways & State Highways. National Highways NH 66 ( Panvel – Edapally ), NH 166 ( Ratnagiri – Nagpur ) and Coastal Highway ( Rewas – Reddy ) pass through the city. MSRTC operates bus services to Mumbai, Thane, Vasai, Nala Sopara, Kalyan, Bhiwandi, Pune, Panaji, Nanded, Latur, Tuljapur, Akkalkot, Ambajogai, Beed, Kolhapur, Gargoti, Gadhinglaj, Nrushimhawadi, Ichalkaranji, Sangli, Miraj, Tasgaon, Jat, Islampur, Satara, Belgaum, Hubli, Bijapur and other major towns of the state. North Western Karnataka Road Transport Corporation also operates buses from Belgaum, Bijapur, Gulbarga, Indi, Muddebihal, Sindgi, Athani, Jevargi and Talikota. A number of private buses regularly ply for Mumbai and Pune and a few for Kolhapur, Bijapur.

Railways

Ratnagiri is a major Railhead on Konkan Railway route. Ratnagiri is also one of the two divisions of Konkan Railway Corporation. The city is well connected to Mumbai, New Delhi, Amritsar, Chandigarh, Dehradun, Jaipur, Jodhpur, Bikaner, Ahmedabad, Vadodara, Surat, Bhuj, Indore, Jabalpur, Patna, Nagpur, Pune, Margao, Mangalore, Kochi, Thiruvananthapuram, Kanyakumari, Coimbatore and other major towns of the country. Every train passing through the city halts here. Connectivity to western Maharashtra is proposed through Vaibhavwadi Road – Kolhapur route.

Collector and District Magistrate 

M. Devender Singh (IAS:MH2011) has joined as Collector and District Magistrate, Ratnagiri on 01-10-2022.

Political Leadership
Ratnagiri Municipality :

The Ratnagiri Municipality was established in 1876. The incumbent president is Mr.Pradeep Salvi (Shiv Sena).

Ratnagiri (Vidhan Sabha constituency) :

Uday Samant (Shiv Sena), Minister of Higher and Technical Education, Government of Maharashtra represents Ratnagiri constituency in State Assembly since 2004.

Ratnagiri–Sindhudurg (Lok Sabha constituency) :

Vinayak Raut (Shiv Sena) represents Ratnagiri-Sindhudurg constituency in Loksabha, lower house of the parliament since 2014.

Education institutes
Government College of Engineering, Ratnagiri
M.M.A.K.Desai Highschool
Mane's international school
Podar International School, Ratnagiri
Sarvankash Vidya Mandir
Gangadhar Govind Pathwardhan English Medium School (G.G.P.S)
College of Fisheries, Shirgaon, Ratnagiri (DBSKKV)
 Government Polytechnic, Ratnagiri 
 Indian Technical Institute (ITI) Ratnagiri
 Finolex Academy of Management and Technology (An engineering college affiliated to University of Mumbai)
 Government college of Pharmacy, Ratnagiri 
Patwardhan High School, Ratnagiri.
 Phatak High School, Ratnagiri
Late T.P. Kelkar Jr. college of Science Ratnagiri 
 R. B. Shirke High School
 Mistry High School, Ratnagiri
 M. S. Naik High School.
 Gogate Joglekar College
St.Thomas English Medium School
Rajendra Mane College of Engineering & Technology (Affiliated to University of Mumbai)
Rajendra Mane Polytechnic
A.D.Naik Urdu Medium School
Sacred Heart Convent High School, Ratnagiri.
Mane's international school
S.B.Keer Law College.
Jagadguru Narendracharya Maharaj Educational Institute

Marine Biological Research Station
The Maharashtra Government under the Department of Fisheries established the Marine Biological Research Station (MBRS) in 1958 at Ratnagiri, which is presently attached with Dr. Balasaheb Sawant Konkan Krishi Vidyapeeth, Dapoli, Dist.: Ratnagiri. The research station has a 10 hectare area as field facility including a three storied building at the main campus, a well equipped aquarium and museum, a modernised brackish water fish farm, a Mechanized Fishing and Research Vessel, Seed Production facilities and various laboratories at its disposal.

The Marine Biological Research Station, Ratnagiri is one of the premier institutes, especially in the South Konkan Coastal Fisheries Zone, having a mandate for development of fish production technologies, transferring the technologies to fish culturists, entrepreneurs and the industry, and generating professionally trained manpower in fish culture.

History

Ratnagiri was an administrative capital under the Sultanate of Bijapur. A fort built by the Bijapur Sultanate, reconstructed by the Maratha king Shivaji in 1670 is located on a headland near the harbour. In 1731 Ratnagiri came under the control of the Kingdom of Satara, and in 1818 it was annexed to British India.

Ratnagiri is the birthplace of Indian freedom fighter Lokmanya Bal Gangadhar Tilak. He was born on 23 July 1856 after which he moved to Pune with his family when he was 10 years old.

In 1886, King Thibaw of Burma was sent to Ratnagiri after he was deposed and his country annexed by the British Empire. Along with his pregnant wife, his junior queen, and his two young daughters, he would live out the rest of his life in Ratnagiri, as a prisoner of the British Crown. Ratnagiri was chosen for its remote location, some 3,000 miles from Thibaw's former royal seat of Mandalay, accessible only by sea for parts of the year and far from any territory of any rival European power.

Ratnagiri was also the place of confinement for Vinayak Damodar Savarkar from 1921 to 1935, initially in jail and subsequently under local confinement.

See also
Natekarwada
Chiplun
Chiplun Instagram Account

References

External links

Port cities and towns of the Arabian Sea
Port cities in India
Talukas in Maharashtra
Cities and towns in Ratnagiri district
Tourist attractions in Konkan
Ratnagiri
Cities in Maharashtra